Many Moons is a children's picture book written by James Thurber and illustrated by Louis Slobodkin.  It was published by Harcourt, Brace & Company in 1943 and won the Caldecott Medal in 1944. Princess Lenore becomes ill, and only one thing will make her better: the moon.

Despite winning the Caldecott Medal with Slobodkin's original illustrations, a reprint in 1990 by Harcourt featured the text accompanied by new illustrations by Marc Simont.

Plot

Princess Lenore suffers from "a surfeit of raspberry tarts" — eating too many sweets. She insists she is gravely ill, but if her father brings her the moon she'll be well again. 

Her father, the king, asks the wisest men in his court how he can give his daughter the moon, and becomes outraged when they all claim that it is too large, too far away, and composed of unstable or dangerous substances. 

Despairing, the king confides in his court jester. The jester then asks the princess what she thinks the moon is made of, how big it is, and how far away. According to the princess, the moon is as big as her thumbnail and made of gold. She says it's so close that he could climb a tree and pluck it from the sky. He promises to do just that, that very night.

Instead, the jester takes the princess's specifications to the royal goldsmith, who creates a necklace with a moon-like pendant. It is presented to the princess and she becomes well again. 

The next day, the King fears she'll see the moon in the sky and realize that the necklace is a forgery. He consults the wisest men in his court, who propose outrageous schemes to prevent her from seeing it in the sky. 

Ultimately, the jester visits the princess, who is fondly gazing at the newly-risen moon. He asks her how the moon can be in two places, and she tells him the moon always grows back: like a child's tooth, a unicorn's horn, or flowers.

Adaptations
It was made into an opera by American composer, Celius Dougherty.  It was also made into a play, adapted by Charlotte Chorpenning. In 1966, an animated adaptation was produced by Gene Deitch as part of the animated film Alice of Wonderland in Paris. In 1972 an audio version was released by Caedmon Records, read by Peter Ustinov with music by Edgar Summerlin.

References

1943 children's books
Children's fiction books
American picture books
Works by James Thurber
Books illustrated by Marc Simont
Caldecott Medal–winning works
1943 fantasy novels